Milana Aleksandrovna Vayntrub (born March 8, 1987) is an American actress, comedian, and activist. Born in the Soviet Union to Jewish parents, she began her career as a child actress shortly after immigrating to the United States. She came to prominence for her appearances in AT&T television commercials as saleswoman Lily Adams from 2013 to 2016 and since 2020. In addition to her commercial appearances, she was a series regular on the Yahoo! Screen science fiction comedy Other Space (2015) and had a recurring role on the NBC drama This Is Us (2016–2017). Vayntrub has also voiced Squirrel Girl in the Marvel Rising franchise since 2018 after being cast as the character in the unaired television pilot for New Warriors.

Early life and education
Vayntrub was born in Tashkent, Uzbek Soviet Socialist Republic, USSR, and is Jewish. When she was two years old, her parents and she immigrated to the United States as refugees from antisemitism, settling in West Hollywood, California. She started acting in Mattel Barbie commercials at the age of five, in part to mitigate her family's financial problems. Vayntrub dropped out of Beverly Hills High School after her sophomore year, obtained a GED, and went on to earn a baccalaureate in Communication from University of California, San Diego. She studied improv comedy with the Upright Citizens Brigade.

Career

Vayntrub made her acting debut appearing in three episodes of the NBC television series ER in 1995. She and Stevie Nelson teamed up to start the YouTube comedy channel Live Prude Girls where they produced a number of shorts. Live Prude Girls went on to be featured on NewMediaRockstars Top 100 Channels countdown, ranked at number 93. Vayntrub has had small roles in film and television, including Life Happens and Silicon Valley. She has also starred in several CollegeHumor videos.

From 2013 to 2016, Vayntrub portrayed a saleswoman named Lily Adams in a series of TV commercials for AT&T. She returned to the role in 2020. She also portrayed Tina Shukshin as a series regular on the Yahoo! Screen series Other Space, created by Paul Feig, in 2015. The following year, she appeared in Feig's Ghostbusters reboot alongside Other Space cast members Neil Casey, Eugene Cordero, Bess Rous, and Karan Soni. Between 2016 and 2017, she appeared in the television series This Is Us, playing Sloane Sandburg. In July 2017, Vayntrub was cast in the lead role of Marvel Comics superheroine Squirrel Girl in the New Warriors television pilot for Freeform. Freeform ultimately passed on the series that November, and despite attempts to move the series to another network, it was ultimately cancelled. Despite the series' cancellation, Vayntrub voiced Squirrel Girl in the Marvel Rising franchise. She reprised the role for a six-episode scripted podcast from Marvel and Sirius XM titled Marvel's Squirrel Girl: The Unbeatable Radio Show Also in 2017, Vayntrub starred in the Eko interactive streaming television series That Moment When as Jill.

She starred in the film Mother's Little Helpers in 2019, which premiered at South by Southwest. In April 2020, Comedy Central's YouTube channel released three sketches starring Vayntrub and Akilah Hughes as part of a new digital sketch series called Making Fun With Akilah and Milana. She starred in the Quibi streaming television series Die Hart and in the short film The Shabbos Goy as Hannah, both released in July 2020. In 2022, she  also played a leading role in  Comedy Central's television film Out of Office.

Activism
In January 2016, after visiting Greece and meeting with refugee families fleeing the Syrian Civil War, Vayntrub co-founded a website and social media movement called "Can't Do Nothing" to spotlight the European migrant crisis.

Vayntrub is pro-abortion rights; she aborted a pregnancy as a college student because of financial concerns.

Personal life
In 2020, Vayntrub was subjected to a wave of online sexual harassment, some of it based on  images of her that had been manipulated. The campaign began on an AT&T social media site, and the company came to her defense, stating "We will not tolerate the inappropriate comments and harassment of Milana Vayntrub, the talented actor that portrays Lily in our ads," and shut down comments. Vayntrub asked for the harassment to stop in an Instagram live stream, saying "I'm hurting and it's bringing up, like, a lot of feelings of sexual assault".

Vayntrub is married and has one son.

Filmography

Film

Television

Web

Music videos

Video games

References

External links

 Can't Do Nothing, a non-profit organization formed by Milana
 
 

1987 births
20th-century American actresses
21st-century American actresses
American child actresses
American people of Uzbekistani-Jewish descent
American television actresses
Beverly Hills High School alumni
Living people
Jewish American actresses
Jewish refugees
Soviet Jews
Soviet emigrants to the United States
Uzbekistani emigrants to the United States
Uzbekistani Jews
University of California, San Diego alumni
Jewish women activists
Jewish American activists